William and Kate may refer to the following:

William, Prince of Wales, and Catherine, Princess of Wales
Wedding of Prince William and Catherine Middleton, in 2011
William & Kate: The Movie, a 2011 U.S. television film
William & Catherine: A Royal Romance, a 2011 U.S. television film